The 1998 Skoda Grand Prix was a professional ranking snooker tournament that took place between 14–25 October 1998 at the Guild Hall in Preston, England.

Dominic Dale was the defending champion, but he lost his last 64 match against Robin Hull.

Stephen Lee and Marco Fu both contested a ranking tournament final for the first time in their careers, Fu in his first tournament as a professional being ranked 377 at the time of his final appearance; the lowest ranked finalist at any ranking event. Lee prevailed 9–2 to claim his first ranking title.

Tournament summary 

Defending champion Dominic Dale was the number 1 seed with World Champion John Higgins seeded 2. The remaining places were allocated to players based on the world rankings.

Prize fund
The breakdown of prize money for this year is shown below:

Winner: £60,000
Runner-up: £32,000
Semi-final: £16,000
Quarter-final: £9,100
Last 16: £4,600
Last 32: £2,600
Last 64: £2,225

Stage one highest break: £1,100
Stage two highest break: £5,000
Total: £370,000

Main draw

Final

Century breaks

139  Peter Ebdon
134  Ronnie O'Sullivan
129  Martin Clark
128, 126, 106, 104  Stephen Lee
123  Marco Fu
121, 111, 110  Quinten Hann
121  John Parrott

120  Tony Drago
115, 107  Chris Small
110  Dene O'Kane
108  Stephen Hendry
106  Jason Ferguson
104, 103  Dave Harold
104, 102  Mark Williams

References 

1998
Grand Prix
Grand Prix (snooker)